The men's freestyle light heavyweight competition at the 1960 Summer Olympics in Rome took place from 1 to 6 September at the Basilica of Maxentius. Nations were limited to one competitor.

Competition format

This freestyle wrestling competition continued to use the "bad points" elimination system introduced at the 1928 Summer Olympics for Greco-Roman and at the 1932 Summer Olympics for freestyle wrestling, though adjusted the point values slightly. Wins by fall continued to be worth 0 points and wins by decision continued to be worth 1 point. Losses by fall, however, were now worth 4 points (up from 3). Losses by decision were worth 3 points (consistent with most prior years, though in some losses by split decision had been worth only 2 points). Ties were now allowed, worth 2 points for each wrestler. The elimination threshold was also increased from 5 points to 6 points. The medal round concept, used in 1952 and 1956 requiring a round-robin amongst the medalists even if one or more finished a round with enough points for elimination, was used only if exactly three wrestlers remained after a round—if two competitors remained, they faced off head-to-head; if only one, he was the gold medalist.

Results

Round 1

Martina withdrew after his bout.

 Bouts

 Points

Round 2

 Bouts

 Points

Round 3

 Bouts

 Points

Round 4

 Bouts

 Points

Round 5

This round left two wrestlers uneliminated; they advanced to face each other in the final (even though Atlı could not possibly catch Takhti on points—the winner of the final would take the gold medal). Two wrestlers were eliminated tied for third at 6 points; they would compete in a bronze medal bout.

 Bouts

 Points

Round 6

The bronze medal bout ended in a tie, so body weight was used to determine the winner. Albul was lighter and therefore took the bronze medal.

Atlı defeated Takhti in the final, giving the Turkish wrestler the gold medal regardless of points.

 Bronze medal bout

 Final

 Points

References

Wrestling at the 1960 Summer Olympics